Emesh is a Sumerian god of vegetation. He was created, alongside the god Enten, at the wish of Enlil to take responsibility on earth for woods, fields, sheep folds, and stables. He is identified with the abundance of the earth and with summer.

References 

Michael Jordan, Encyclopedia of Gods, Kyle Cathie Limited, 2002

Mesopotamian gods
Fertility gods
Earth gods
Nature gods
Agricultural gods